The Cerro Azul Formation, in the Buenos Aires Province also described as Epecuén Formation, is a geological formation of Late Miocene (Tortonian, or Huayquerian in the SALMA classification) age in the Colorado Basin of the Buenos Aires and La Pampa Provinces in northeastern Argentina.

The fluvial and aeolian siltstones, sandstones and tuffs of the formation contain many mammals, such as Thylacosmilus and Macrauchenia, reptiles, amphibians and fossils of terror birds as well as Argentavis, the largest flying bird ever discovered.

Description 

The Cerro Azul Formation crops out in patches in the southwestern Buenos Aires Province and southeastern Pampa Province. The Epecuén Formation has been correlated to the Cerro Azul Formation in the early 2000s. The Cerro Azul and Epecuén Formations were named after the Cerro Azul ("Blue Hill") and Epecuén Lake where the formation crops out. The formation overlies crystalline basement or the Arroyo Chasicó Formation. The mammal assemblage of the Cerro Azul-Epecuén unit is the most diverse for the Huayquerian Late Miocene age, possibly ranging into the Pliocene. The formation is considered contemporaneous with the Río Negro Formation of the Colorado Basin.

The unit is characterized by a monotonous succession of loess containing moderately developed paleosols. In particular, the formation is considered as representing the interval between 10 and 5.7 Ma.

The Cerro Azul Formation deposits were described by Linares et al. in 1980. They are discontinuous along the whole occupied area in the provinces of La Pampa and Buenos Aires. They are composed of silts, sandy silts and very thin silty sands, reddish and brown colored, with a homogeneous and compact general aspect, and frequent carbonate nodules and evidences of pedogenic processes. Visconti et al. (2010) interpreted them as eolian deposits characterized by loessic materials, with a high percentage of lithic fragments and volcaniclastic sediments.

The sediments and their fauna belong to a sedimentary and faunal cycle, which followed the withdrawal (around 10 Ma) of a widespread marine transgression that extended from central Argentina, to western Uruguay and southern Paraguay and Brazil, the "Paraná Sea" or mar paranense in Spanish.

Large cylindrical sediment-filled structures, 115 of which interpreted as mammal burrows occur within the loess-paleosol sequence of the formation.

Fossil content 
The following fossils have been recovered from the formation:

Locations:
La Pampa

 Barrancas Coloradas - Cerro Azul Formation - La Pampa
 Caleufú - Cerro Azul Formation - La Pampa
 Cerro El Chancho - Cerro Azul Formation - La Pampa
 Cerro Patagua - Cerro Azul Formation - La Pampa
 Estancia Don Mariano - Cerro Azul Formation - La Pampa
 Estancia El Recado - Cerro Azul Formation - La Pampa
 Estancia Ré - Cerro Azul Formation - La Pampa
 El Guanaco - Cerro Azul Formation - La Pampa
 Huayquerías de San Carlos - Cerro Azul Formation - La Pampa
 Laguna Chillhué - Cerro Azul Formation - La Pampa
 Laguna Guatraché - Cerro Azul Formation - La Pampa
 Quehué - Cerro Azul Formation - La Pampa
 Salinas Grandes de Hidalgo - Cerro Azul Formation - La Pampa
 Telen - Cerro Azul Formation - La Pampa

Buenos Aires

 Bajo Giuliani - Cerro Azul Formation - Buenos Aires
 Barrancas de Sarmiento - Cerro Azul Formation - Buenos Aires
 Eduardo Castex - Cerro Azul Formation - Buenos Aires
 Estancia los Médanos - Cerro Azul Formation - Buenos Aires
 Estancia Quiñi-Malal - Cerro Azul Formation - Buenos Aires
 Grünbein Cantera Seminario - Cerro Azul Formation - Buenos Aires
 Grünbein Cantera Seminario Level 2 - Cerro Azul Formation - Buenos Aires
 Laguna Epecuén - Cerro Azul Formation - Buenos Aires
 Laguna La Paraguaya - Cerro Azul Formation - Buenos Aires
 Puesto Colorado - Cerro Azul Formation - Buenos Aires
 Ruta 14 - Cerro Azul Formation - Buenos Aires
 Arroyo Guaminí - Epecuén Formation - Buenos Aires
 Carhué - Epecuén Formation - Buenos Aires
 Laguna de los Paraguayos - Epecuén Formation - Buenos Aires
 Robilote Field - SE of Epecuén lagoon & E of Laguna de Epecuén - Epecuén Formation - Buenos Aires
 Salinas Grandes de Hidalgo - Epecuén Formation - Buenos Aires

SALMA correlations

See also 

 South American land mammal ages
 Honda Group
 Ituzaingó Formation
 Pebas Formation
 Urumaco

References

Bibliography 

Geology
 
 

Paleontology
 
 
 
 
 
 
 
 
 
 
 
 
 
 
 
 
 
 
 
 
 
 
 
 
 
 
 
 
 
 
 
 
 
 
 
 
 

 
Geologic formations of Argentina
Miocene Series of South America
Tortonian
Huayquerian
Neogene Argentina
Sandstone formations
Siltstone formations
Conglomerate formations
Aeolian deposits
Fluvial deposits
Lacustrine deposits
Fossiliferous stratigraphic units of South America
Paleontology in Argentina
Formations
Formations